The William McKinley Monument, or McKinley Memorial, is a statue and quotation array honoring the assassinated United States President William McKinley which stands in front of the Ohio Statehouse in Columbus, Ohio. Created by Hermon Atkins MacNeil between 1903 and 1906, with the assistance of his wife Carol Brooks MacNeil, the Monument was dedicated in September 1907.

Description
The full-size statue of McKinley on a fifteen-foot pedestal is flanked by statues representing Peace and Prosperity.

Gallery

See also
 McKinley Monument, Buffalo, New York
 McKinley National Memorial, Canton, Ohio
 List of sculptures of presidents of the United States
 Presidential memorials in the United States

References

External links

 

1906 sculptures
1907 establishments in Ohio
Bronze sculptures in Ohio
Granite sculptures in Ohio
Monuments and memorials in Ohio
Ohio Statehouse
Outdoor sculptures in Columbus, Ohio
Sculptures of men in Ohio
Statues in Columbus, Ohio
Statues of William McKinley
High Street (Columbus, Ohio)
Sculptures of children in the United States